Dr. John F. Sarwark is Martha Washington Foundation Professor of Pediatric Orthopedics at Lurie Children's Hospital; Former Head, Pediatric Orthopedic Surgery, Lurie Children's Hospital; and Professor of Orthopaedic Surgery, Northwestern University's Feinberg School of Medicine in Chicago, Illinois.

Education
Sarwark earned his Medical Doctorate at Northwestern University Medical School and is alumnus member of Alpha Omega Alpha Honor Medical Society.  He completed his residency in Orthopaedic Surgery at Northwestern University Medical School Affiliated Hospitals and completed training as a clinical fellow in pediatric orthopaedics at the Alfred I. duPont Hospital for Children, Wilmington, Delaware. He is recognized leader in the evaluation, management, and research of scoliosis in children.

Awards and accolades
Sarwark is active in numerous ongoing leadership activities and committees at Lurie Children's Hospital and NUFSM; including Research Strategic Planning LC; the Department of Orthopaedic Surgery, Feinberg School of Medicine and its Education and Residency Selection Committee, past Medical Faculty Senate Council Member and National Alumni Board Member. He is past President, Nathan Smith Davis (Alumni) Club of NUFSM. Dr. Sarwark is past Medical Director for the Motion Analysis Center at Children's Memorial Hospital. In 2004, he received the Pathways Awareness Foundation's first Pioneer Award for his work in the early detection of  mobility problems in infants. Dr. Sarwark received the prestigious Arnold Gold Foundation Humanism in Medicine Award from AAP Leadership at the 2014 AAPNCE, the Foundation Award 'honors a medical school faculty physician who exemplifies the qualities of a caring and compassionate mentor in the teaching and advising of medical students...the goal of the award is to emphasize, reinforce and enhance the importance of humanistic qualities among medical students and faculty.'  Dr. Sarwark received the 20th Annual Distinguished Service Award, AAP Section on Orthopaedics, 2015 National Conference and Exhibition, Saturday, October 24, 2015—Washington, DC.

Association offices
He has served two terms as chairman, executive committee/Section of Orthopaedics of the American Academy of Pediatrics (AAP) as well as the SAP (surgical advisory panel) of the AAP.  He served two terms on the AAP NCEPG (National Conference and Exhibition and Planning Group); he is a member of the Section on Sports Medicine and Fitness (SOSMF) of the AAP.  Sarwark is an active member of the Pediatric Orthopaedic Society of North America (POSNA) on which he has twice served as a member of its board of directors and as Ex Officio member.  He has served as chair of POSNA's liaison committee with OKO of the American Academy of Orthopaedic Surgeons (AAOS).  Sarwark has chaired and contributes to numerous specialty society meetings and courses.  He has for many years served as a faculty member of the AAOS Basic Course for Orthopaedic Educators.  He has chaired the American Academy of Orthopaedic Surgeons’ Committee on Patient Education and has served as a member of its Steering Committee on Collaboration Among Providers Involved with Musculoskeletal Care among others.  Sarwark is active in the Scoliosis Research Society and has served on its education committee, chaired the Fellowship C, co-chaired the C on Non-operative Management and is a past member of the SRS Worldwide Course C.  He is a member of the American Orthopaedic Association, 20th Century Orthopaedic Association, American Academy for Cerebral Palsy and Developmental Medicine, Society for Research into Hydrocephalus and Spina Bifida, and the American Society of Biomechanics, among others. Recognized around the world as being among the finest surgeons and educators in his field, Dr. Sarwark travels widely on numerous medical exchanges annually. Dr. Sarwark has also mentored numerous fellows, residents, and students in the various facets of medical education and beyond.

Books

• John F. Sarwark MD FAAP FAAOS and 1 more

Pediatric Orthopaedics and Sports Injuries: A Quick Reference Guide
Third Edition

ISBN 978-1610025041, ISBN 1610025040

References

External links
 American Academy of Pediatrics Web site
 American Academy of Orthopaedic Surgeons Web site
 Orthopedic Knowledge Online
 Dr. Sarwark bio on Children's Memorial Hospital Web site

Living people
American pediatricians
Feinberg School of Medicine alumni
Northwestern University faculty
Year of birth missing (living people)